The Minister of National Defence is the minister responsible for the Ministry of National Defense.

Ministers of National Defense 
The following ministers have served:

Notes

References

Military of the Republic of China